Tata 2 (Dad 2) is an album by Kult, released in March 1996. It is the second album of songs written by singer Kazik's father Stanisław Staszewski.

Track listing
 "Jeśli chcesz odejść – odejdź" – 3:48 (If You Wish To Leave – Leave)
 "Kochaj mnie, a będę twoją" – 3:50 (Love Me And I Shall Be Yours)
 "Śmierć poety" – 5:36 (The Death of the Poet)
 "Nie dorosłem do swych lat" – 5:40 (I Didn't Grow Up to my Age)
 "Ty albo żadna" – 2:48 (You or Nobody)
 "Samotni ludzie" – 8:19 (Lonely People)
 "Zastanówcie się sami" – 5:11 (Think About It Yourselves)
 "Gwiazda szeryfa" – 4:10 (Sheriff's Star)
 "Ballada o dwóch siostrach" – 4:55 (The Ballad of Two Sisters)
 "Kołysanka stalinowska" – 3:06 (Stalin Lullaby)
 "Latający Holender" – 5:56 (The Flying Dutchman)
 "A gdy będę umierał" – 7:32 (And When I'll Be Dying)
 "Prowokator" – 2:35 (The Entrapment Man)
 "Dolina" – 2:39 (The Valley)
 "Marianna (wersja inaczej niż na 1)" – 3:43 (Marianna (other version than on 1))
 "Kochaj mnie, a będę twoją (wersja bez VV)" – 3:49 (Love Me And I Shall Be Yours (version without VV))

Credits
 Kazik Staszewski – lead vocalist, saxophone;
 Janusz Grudziński – piano, keyboards, guitar;
 Krzysztof Banasik – French horn, guitar, saxophone, vocalist;
 Piotr Morawiec – guitar;
 Andrzej Szymańczak – drumset;
 Ireneusz Wereński – bass guitar;
 Violetta Villas – vocalist;
 Rafał Szpotakowski – violin;
 Wojciech Przybylski – sound engineer;

See also 
 Stanisław Staszewski

References
 

Kult (band) albums
1996 albums